"Let Me Clear My Throat" is a song by American hip-hop artist DJ Kool. It was released in April 1996 as the third and final single from his album of the same name. It was recorded live at the Bahama Bay club in Philadelphia.

Song description 
The most popular version of the song is the one recorded live at Bahama Bay. This version incorporates audience cheers, shouts, and participation.

The musical content of the song consists entirely of two samples: the introductory fanfare of "Hollywood Swinging" (1974) by Kool & The Gang, used in both the intro and pre-chorus, and a chopped half of "The 900 Number" (1987) by The 45 King (which itself includes a two-bar loop of the saxophone riff and drums that was lifted from "Unwind Yourself" (1968) by Marva Whitney), used in the verses and chorus.

Aside from a 16-line verse in the first half of the song, the lyrical content consists largely of audience-pleasing antics, energetic shouts, call-and-response, and shout-outs. Kool makes lyrical nods to a grittier house party history of hip-hop, dropping references from early hip-hop and soul artists such as Run DMC, James Brown, and Whistle. Likewise, the title and common line of the song, "let me clear my throat," is itself taken from the Beastie Boys' "The New Style" from 1986's Licensed to Ill.

Other uses
The song was chosen as the Buffalo Sabres official goal song as part of an online fan vote on the team's official website.

The song is used to pump up the crowd at Nebraska Cornhuskers football games.

The song is also used as the theme song for BBC Radio Scotland football show Off The Ball.

The song is featured in the second trailer to Office Christmas Party.

Track listing
 "Let Me Clear My Throat" (Old-School Reunion Edit) – 4:25
 "Let Me Clear My Throat" (Klassic Kool Original Version) – 4:51
 "Let Me Clear My Throat" (Old-School Reunion Remix) – 4:53
 "Let Me Clear My Throat" (45 King Bass 'N' Funk Remix) – 4:32
 "Let Me Clear My Throat" (Funkmaster Flex Remix) – 3:48
 "Let Me Clear My Throat" (No 'Damn' Old-School Reunion Remix) – 4:54
 "Let Me Clear My Throat" (Tupac Tribute Edit) – 1:22

Charts and certifications

Weekly charts

Year-end charts

Certifications

|}

References

1996 debut singles
1996 songs
DJ Kool songs
Go-go songs
American Recordings (record label) singles
Songs written by Claydes Charles Smith
Songs written by Ronald Bell (musician)
Songs written by Robert "Kool" Bell